Saint Louis or Saint-Louis, is the capital of Senegal's Saint-Louis Region. Saint-Louis was the capital of the French colony of Senegal from 1673 until 1902 and French West Africa from 1895 until 1902, when the capital was moved to Dakar. From 1920 to 1957, it also served as the capital of the neighboring colony of Mauritania.

The town was an important economic center during French West Africa, but it is less important now. However it still has important industries, including tourism, a commercial center, a center of sugar production, and fishing. The Tourism industry is in part due to the city being listed as a UNESCO World Heritage Site in 2000. However, the city is also vulnerable to climate change—where sea level rise is expected to threaten the city center and potential damage historical parts of the city.     Moreover, other issues such as overfishing is causing ripple effects in the local economy.

Names
Saint Louis is named after LouisIX, a canonized 13th-century king of France. Obliquely, the name also honored LouisXIV, the reigning king of France at the time of the island's settlement in 1659. It was originally known as Saint Louis of the Fort after its stronghold and to distinguish it from other places of the same name. The Langue de Barbarie takes its name from the French for "Barbary Tongue", after an old name for the land of the Berbers.

The local name Ndar or N'dar is Wolof for a kind of island and has been borne by the island since before the French settlement. Ndar Tout or Toute is a Gallicized form of a Wolof name meaning "Little" or "Lesser Saint Louis". The neighborhood of Guet Ndar takes its name from a Wolof word for "pasture".

Geography

Saint-Louis is situated in northern Senegal, on the border with Mauritania, although the nearest border crossing is at Rosso,  up the Senegal River.

The island lies in the Senegal River. The Langue de Barbarie is the location of the seaside neighborhoods Ndar Toute and Guet Ndar. On the mainland, the east bank of the river is the site of Sor, an older settlement now considered a suburb of Saint-Louis. It is nearly surrounded by tidal marshes.

Three characteristics give Saint-Louis its distinctive geographic appearance: the Sahel, the marshes and the Langue de Barbarie.

Part of the Sahel, a transitional desertic band that separates  "[...] the dunes of the Sahara from the baobabs of the savanna", Saint-Louis' landscape is characterized by occasional acacias and is disturbed by sand storms during the dry season.

The marshes are flood basins that form during the rainy season when the river overflows into the countryside, creating ponds and stretches of mangroves that attract birds like flamingos and pelicans.

Its vegetation mainly consists of Filao trees, propagated to prevent soil erosion in sandy and salty soils.

Climate
Saint-Louis has a hot desert climate (Köppen climate classification BWh). It only has two seasons, the rainy season from June to October, characterized by heat, humidity and storms, and the dry season from November to May, characterized by cool ocean breeze and dust from the Harmattan winds. A 2011 documentary described Saint-Louis as the African city most threatened by rising sea levels.

Environmental issues 

In 2017 Saint-Louis, Senegal have seen a large decline in harvest, causing ripple effects on nutrition and food supply in the country, where 75% of animal protein comes from fish. Fisherman from the community spend twice as much time for catching smaller hauls, and are now competing with foreign fishing vessels.

Rising sea levels, as well as water levels flowing out of the Senegal River now threaten the low-lying islands which make up the city. In June 2008, Alioune Badiane of the United Nations' UN-Habitat agency designated Saint-Louis as "the city most threatened by rising sea levels in the whole of Africa", citing climate change and a failed 2004  river and tidal canal project as the cause. Since the coast of the community has eroded by 1–2 meters a year.

History

A Wolof settlement at what is now known as Guet Ndar dates from around 1450 and was a meeting and departure point for Muslim pilgrims traveling to Mecca in Arabia.

Repeated flooding prompted the removal of the fort to the island known to locals as Ndar in 1659. The island was uninhabited at the time, supposedly because the local people believed it to be haunted by spirits. The Diagne of Sor, the local leader, permitted French settlement on the island for annual payments of "three pieces of blue cloth, a measure of scarlet cloth, seven long iron bars, and 10 pints of eau de vie."

The fortification permitted its factory to command foreign trade along the Senegal River. Slaves, hides, beeswax, ambergris and, later, gum arabic were exported. During the Seven Years' War, British forces captured Senegal in 1758. In February 1779, French forces recaptured Saint-Louis. In the late 18th century, Saint-Louis had about 5,000 inhabitants, not counting an indeterminate number of slaves in transit.

Between 1659 and 1779, nine chartered companies succeeded one another in administering Saint-Louis. As in Gorée, a Franco-African Creole, or Métis, merchant community characterized by the famous "signares", or bourgeois women entrepreneurs, grew up in Saint-Louis during the 17th and 18th centuries. The Métis were important to the economic, social, cultural and political life of the city. They created a distinctive urban culture characterized by public displays of elegance, refined entertainment and popular festivities. They controlled most of the up-country river trade and they financed the principal Catholic institutions. A Métis mayor was first designated by the Governor in 1778. Civic franchise was further consolidated in 1872, when Saint-Louis became a French "commune".

Wreckage of the Medusa: La Méduse was a French naval frigate that boasted 40 guns and fought in the Napoleonic Wars of the early 19th century. Remarkably, the ship survived these maritime battles only to crash on a sandbank in 1816 during the reestablishment of the French colony after the British handover. A shortage of lifeboats sent sailors scrambling to build a raft. Only 10 of approximately 150 people who boarded the raft lived through this catastrophe. Shortly thereafter, Géricault drew his inspiration from the accounts of two survivors.

In the 1855 Battle of Leybar Bridge a small force of French Marines defended the town from a large enemy force. Louis Faidherbe, who became the Governor of the Colony of Senegal in 1854, contributed greatly to the development and modernization of Saint Louis. His large-scale projects included the building of bridges, provisioning of fresh drinking water, and the construction of an overland telegraph line to Dakar. Saint-Louis became capital of the federation of French West African colonies in 1895, but relinquished this role to Dakar in 1902.

Saint-Louis's fortunes began to wane as those of Dakar waxed. Access to its port became increasingly awkward in the age of the steamship and the completion of the Dakar-Saint Louis railroad in 1885 meant that up-country trade effectively circumvented its port. Large French firms, many from the city of Bordeaux, took over the new commercial networks of the interior, marginalizing the Métis traders in the process. Saint-Louis nonetheless maintained its status as capital of the Colony of Senegal even after Dakar assumed the role of capital of the French West Africa federation. The colonial institutions set up in the city in the 19th century, such as the Muslim Tribunal and the School for Chiefs' Sons, were to play important roles in the history of French Africa. Though relatively small in size (population of 10,000 in 1826; 23,000 in 1914, and 39,000 in 1955) Saint-Louis dominated Senegalese politics throughout the 19th and early 20th centuries, not least because of its numerous political parties and associations and its independent newspapers.

Following independence, when Dakar became sole capital of the country, Saint-Louis slipped into a state of lethargy. As its French population and military departed, many of the town's shops, offices and businesses closed. This generated a loss of jobs and human potential, and less investment in the economic activities of Saint-Louis, thus causing its economic decline. For some people, however, Saint-Louis' decline was not just limited to its economy, but spread to all aspects of its life as the loss of its past status meant less recognition and lack of interest from the colony's officials and, after Senegal's independence, from the Senegalese government. When its most famous political son, the French-educated lawyer Lamine Guèye, died in 1968, the city lost its strongest proponent.

Today, rich in three centuries of history, in cultural background, geography, architecture, and other characteristics, Saint-Louis is a bridge between the savanna and the desert, the ocean and the river, tradition and modernity, Islam and Christianity, Europe and Africa.

Home to a society with a distinctive lifestyle, Saint-Louis has retained its unique identity. "No one comes without falling in love with the city," proudly say its people who consider Saint-Louis as the birthplace of Senegalese Teranga, the Wolof word for hospitality.

Economy
Saint-Louis' economy is a third important, yet critical, facet of its identity. As is supported in the article, Saint Louis has economically declined since the transfer of the Capital of French Western Africa to Dakar. This has caused the dispossession of Saint Louis of all its past economic attributes and is said to have "[...] reached its paroxysm in 1960 when the  capital of the independent Senegal was transferred to Dakar". Saint-Louis, however, has remained an important tourist and trading center  and the city's economy, though not entirely recovered, is gradually reviving.

The city was listed as a UNESCO World Heritage Site in 2000 and cultural tourism has become an engine of growth. As a result, a process of gentrification has set in, with many historic buildings on the island being turned into restaurants and hotels.

Beyond tourism, Saint-Louis is also a commercial and an industrial centre for sugar production. Its other economic activities are fishing, irrigated alluvial agriculture, pastoral farming, trading and exportation of peanut skins. It is important to note that each of these economic activities is assured by a particular ethnic group. The Wolofs and Lebous who are the main inhabitants of Saint-Louis are mostly fishermen that live in fishing communities like Guet-Ndar on the Langue de Barbarie. The Fulas live in the inland and practice pastoral farming.

Culture 

Culture constitutes an important part of Saint-Louis' economy. The city preserves much of its 19th-century morphology, reminiscent of other cities of the "Creole Atlantic": Bahia, Cartagena, Havana and New Orleans. Thanks to its distinctive appearance, numerous sites of attraction and its international music festivals and cultural exhibitions, Saint-Louis attracts many tourists each year.

Saint-Louis remains the most characteristically French colonial destination in West Africa along with Gorée Island.

Museums 

Saint-Louis' Research Center and Documentation Museum of Senegal offers interesting panoramas of Senegal's history and ethnic movements over the years, expositions of traditional clothes and musical instruments, etc.

Events and festivals 
Saint Louis is famous for its urban culture. The heritage of the signares lives on in the city's many festivals and its cultivated sense of public display, and it is helping Saint-Louis emerge from decades of neglect. "Fanals", which are night-time processions of giant paper lanterns, take place at Christmas time.

The Saint-Louis Jazz Festival is the most important jazz festival in Africa. Jazz first became popular in the 1930s when records produced in Cuba were aired on the radio. After World War II, visiting U.S. GIs popularized jazz bands and by the 1950s local groups had adopted a "Cuban" sound. Another music festival, 1, 2, 3 musiques, exhibits various genres of music.

The Festival Métissons, held for the first time in 2010, is a grassroots music festival organized by local communities and small businesses. Every edition sports international, national and local musical talent.

The annual reggata, or pirogue race organized by teams of fishermen from Guet-Ndar, takes place on the "little branch" of the river, between Ndar Island and the Langue de Barbarie.

The Magal of the Niari Rakas, a yearly commemoration of Cheikh Ahmadou Bamba Mbacké's (the founder of Mouridism) two prayers in the Governor's Palace in 1895, is the city's largest religious gathering.

UNESCO World Heritage Site
Saint-Louis' characteristic colonial architecture along with its regular town plan, its location on an island at the mouth of the Senegal River and the system of quays, gives Saint-Louis the distinctive appearance and identity that have raised the Island to the rank of world heritage since 2000. The Island of Saint-Louis is inscribed on the World Heritage list on the basis of criteria ii and iv:

Criterion ii The historic town of Saint-Louis exhibits an important exchange of values   and influences on the development of education and culture, architecture, craftsmanship, and services in a large part of West Africa.

Criterion iv The Island of Saint-Louis, a former capital of West Africa, is an outstanding example of a colonial city, characterized by its particular natural setting, and it illustrates the development of colonial government in this region.

Architecture 
Among interesting and attractive monuments and edifices are the Governor's Palace, the Gouvernance where are located the town's administrative offices, the Parc Faidherbe named for the French governor at the centre of town Louis Faidherbe, colonial-era hotels, the historic airport at Dakar-Bango on the mainland, the Faidherbe Bridge that connects the island to the Langue de Barbarie and the Gaol and Servatius bridges that connect the island to the continent.

Places of worship 

The places of worship are predominantly Muslim mosques.  There are also Christian churches and temples: Roman Catholic Diocese of Saint-Louis du Sénégal (Catholic Church), Assemblies of God, Universal Church of the Kingdom of God.

Natural sites

This park, which is 20 square kilometres large, occupies the southern point of the Langue de Barbarie, the estuary of the Senegal river and part of the continent. It hosts thousands of water birds like cormorants, brushes, pink flamingos, pelicans, herons and ducks each year.

The world's third largest ornithological park, it is located 60 kilometers north of Saint-Louis. This park occupies over 120 km² and includes part of the river, and many lakes, basins, and marshes. About 3 million migrating birds of 400 species visit it each year.

Located at a dozen kilometers south of the city of Saint-Louis, this reserve has an area of 7 square kilometres and shelters birds and endangered species such as the Dama Gazelle, the Patas monkey and the African spurred tortoise.

Education

Education is another important facet of Saint-Louis. With a large influence over education in colonial times, Saint Louis is now a centre of educational excellence. It is home to the University Gaston Berger and The Military Academy Charles Ntchorere.

Senegal's second university, the University Gaston Berger, which was created in 1990, offers studies organized in a number of general education and research faculties.

The Military Academy Charles Ntchorere, commonly known as the Prytanee Militaire of Saint Louis, was created in 1922.

The École française Antoine-de-Saint-Exupéry, a French international school serving preschool through collège (junior high school), is located in Saint-Louis.

Notable inhabitants
Saint Louis has been the birthplace or home of:
 El Hadj Malick Sy
 Cheikh Ahmadou Bamba Mbacké
 Alfred-Amédée Dodds
 Jean-Baptiste Labat, Abbé David Boilat, Daniel Brattier, the fathers 
 Michel Adanson, naturalist
 Louis Faidherbe
 Blaise Diagne, Lamine Guèye, politicians
  Mbarick Fall aka Battling Siki boxer
 El Hadji Diouf football player 
 BK VEF Rīga center Bamba Fall
 the French photographer François-Edmond Fortier
 Badara Ndiaye (born 1986), Senegalese visual concept developer and fashion designer
 Ismaïla Sarr football player
 Abdoulaye Seye Senegalese Sprinter & Footballer

Twin towns – sister cities
Saint-Louis is twinned with:
 Lille, France (1978)
 Fez, Morocco (1979)
 Liège, Belgium (1980)
 Bologna, Italy (1991)
 St. Louis, United States (1994)

References

Aïdara, Abdoul Hadir (2005), Saint-Louis du Sénégal: d'hier à aujourd'hui, Grandvaux, Brinon-sur-Sauldre.

Bibliography

External links

Senegal's decaying city of charm, Tidiane Sy, BBC News, 13 May 2005.
saintlouisdusenegal.com: "Le portail touristique et culturel de Saint-Louis du Senegal". Saint-Louis news and culture portal.
Saint-Louis du Sénégal, Ville de l'élégance et du raffinement, Radio France International, 2004.

Events in Saint-Louis, Senegal
saintlouisjazz.com
festivalmetissons.com

 
Communes of Senegal
Populated places in Saint-Louis Region
Populated coastal places in Senegal
Regional capitals in Senegal
Senegal River
French West Africa
Populated places established in 1659
1659 establishments in Africa
1659 establishments in the French colonial empire
Saint-Louis Region
World Heritage Sites in Senegal